Polygamy in Myanmar, also known as Burma, was outlawed in 2015.  Prior to that date, polygamy was practiced among some people.

References 

Society of Myanmar
Myanmar